Malevil is a 1981 post-apocalyptic French film directed by Christian de Chalonge. It's the adaptation of the 1972 science fiction novel Malevil by Robert Merle.

Plot
The film takes place in a small village named "Malevil" within central France. Due to an administrative issue, the mayor, pharmacist, farmers, traders, and other villagers attend a meeting in the local château's large wine cellar on a beautiful sunny day in late summer. However, while the meeting is taking place the radio suddenly cuts out. Moments later, huge explosions occur followed by long and violent flashes. The noise, excessive heat, and moisture cause everyone in the  cellar to fall unconscious.

The survivors awaken to find a scorched world where almost nothing remains. They embark on a new life faced with isolationism and violence.

Cast

 Michel Serrault : Emmanuel Comte 
 Jacques Dutronc : Colin
 Jean-Louis Trintignant : Fulbert
 Jacques Villeret : Momo
 Robert Dhéry : Peyssou
 Hanns Zischler : le vétérinaire
 Pénélope Palmer : Evelyne
 Jean Leuvrais : Bouvreuil
 Emilie Lihou : La Menou
 Jacqueline Parent : Cathy
 Eduard Linkers : Fabrelatre
 Marianik Revillon : Emma
 Guy Saint-Jean : un gendarme
 Bernard Waver : un gendarme
 Reine Bartève : Judith
 Michel Berto : Bébé007

Production
The screenplay is based on the 1972 novel Malevil by French science fiction writer Robert Merle. Despite using the book's characters, the plot deviates almost entirely from the book. A different ending was also used in the film. Merle, who believed that the spirit of his novel had been misrepresented, asked for his name to be not mentioned in the credits. Instead, the film states the film was only inspired by the novel Malevil (French:inspiré librement du roman Malevil).

External links
 Malevil'' at the Internet Movie Database

1981 films
1980s science fiction drama films
Films scored by Gabriel Yared
Films directed by Christian de Chalonge
Films set in France
French post-apocalyptic films
French science fiction drama films
1981 drama films
1980s French-language films
1980s French films